Parastesilea grisescens is a species of beetle in the family Cerambycidae. It was described by Stephan von Breuning in 1938, originally under the genus Stesilea.

References

Pteropliini
Beetles described in 1938